Sachsenhäger Aue is a river of Lower Saxony, Germany. Its mouth is the confluence of the Rodenberger Aue and the Sachsenhäger Aue, forming the Westaue.

See also
List of rivers of Lower Saxony

References

Rivers of Lower Saxony
Rivers of Germany